"You Sexy Thing" is a song by British musical group Hot Chocolate. It was written by lead singer Errol Brown and bass guitarist Tony Wilson, and was produced by Mickie Most. The song was released in October 1975 as the second single from their second album, Hot Chocolate (1975), and reached number two on the UK Singles Chart in November 1975, as well as number three on the US Billboard Hot 100 the following February. Billboard ranked it the number-twenty-two song for 1976. It went on to gain notability by being featured in films, such as The Full Monty (1997).

Overview
The song was originally a B-side. Not yet convinced that the song could be a hit, producer Most put it on the flip-side of the Hot Chocolate single "Blue Night". The song was later remixed by Most, who re-released it as an A-side some months later on his RAK label. The song was a hit and ultimately became the group's best-known song. In the UK the song was poised for the number-one spot, but was beaten to it by "Bohemian Rhapsody", when on 29 November 1975 the Queen single leapfrogged it from number nine.

A 1987 remix by Ben Liebrand hit number 10. The release of the compilation album The Very Best of Hot Chocolate, featuring the Liebrand remix, reached number one on the UK Albums Chart in February 1987. Ten years later, when it was featured in the film The Full Monty, it went to number six. In the film, the male lead Gaz (played by Robert Carlyle) performs a "striptease" to the music of "You Sexy Thing". Another US resurgence in 1999 can be credited to a Burger King television commercial in which the song played while the camera examined a Double Whopper. In addition, it is the only song to enter the UK top ten in the 1970s, '80s, and '90s.

Structure

"You Sexy Thing" is written in the key of F major and has a simple structure, with most of the song alternating between two major chords (F and B). It has a chorus-verse form. One of the song's most memorable aspects is its distinctive six note riff which is repeated intermittently throughout, played on a mildly overdriven electric guitar on a high treble setting and with noticeable vibrato. In addition to a traditional rock drum kit, the song uses congas, played through a wah-wah pedal in a style reminiscent of tabla. A number of violins accompany the rhythm section. Brown's vocals are sung in an energetic soul fashion, accentuated by the occasional primal, Joe Cocker-style scream. The 1987 remix added a pizzicato-style brass section to the track.

Media uses
"You Sexy Thing" has also been heard in the 1987 film White of the Eye; 1990s films Reservoir Dogs, Heavyweights, Boogie Nights, Sexo, pudor y lágrimas, Dogma, Deuce Bigalow: Male Gigolo, and Bicentennial Man; 2000s films Dude, Where's My Car, Rat Race, About Schmidt, and Nick and Norah's Infinite Playlist; and 2010s film Big Mommas: Like Father, Like Son.

The song was featured the Season 1 episode of That '70s Show called "Thanksgiving".

The song was featured in the pilot episode of the series Malcolm in the Middle and in the original Tales of the City.

Around the mid to late 2000s a censored version of the song featured in a Branston beans advert.

In 2010, the song was featured in promos for the series Hot in Cleveland on TV Land.

The song is later heard over the closing credits and is also included in the 2013 play version of The Full Monty.

In a season 2 episode of the American version of The Office titled "The Dundies", the song is played as Ryan the Temp is presented with the "Hottest in the Office" award.

It was featured in the Brazilian soap opera O Tempo não Para (2018).

In 2019, an altered version of the song was performed by a youth choir in the sixth episode of Netflix comedy series Dead to Me, with the word "sacred" replacing all uses of the word "sexy".

Track listings

1975 release
 7-inch single (Europe, Japan)
 "You Sexy Thing" (Errol Brown, Tony Wilson) – 4:04
 "A Warm Smile" (Harvey Hinsley, Patrick Olive, Tony Connor) – 5:23

 7-inch single (1) (North America)
 "You Sexy Thing" (Errol Brown, Tony Wilson) – 3:30
 "Amazing Skin Song" (Errol Brown) – 4:04

 7-inch single (2) (North America)
 "You Sexy Thing" (Errol Brown, Tony Wilson) – 3:30
 "Call the Police" (Tony Wilson) – 4:04

1987 re-release (remix by Ben Liebrand)
 7-inch single
 "You Sexy Thing" (Errol Brown, Tony Wilson) – 3:46
 "Every 1's a Winner" (Errol Brown) – 4:01

 12-inch single (1)
 "You Sexy Thing (Extended Replay Mix)" (Errol Brown, Tony Wilson) – 7:07
 "You Sexy Thing (Sexy Bonus Beats)" (Errol Brown, Tony Wilson) – 2:33
 "You Sexy Thing (Sexy Instrumental)" (Errol Brown, Tony Wilson) – 3:58
 "Every 1's a Winner" (Errol Brown) – 4:01

 12-inch single (2)
 "You Sexy Thing (Extended Replay Mix)" (Errol Brown, Tony Wilson) – 7:07
 "Megamix" – 9:27
 "Emma" (E. Brown*, T. Wilson)
 "So You Win Again" (Russ Ballard)
 "You Sexy Thing" (E. Brown, T. Wilson)
 "Every 1's a Winner" (Brown)
 "You Could've Been a Lady" (Brown)
 "Heaven Is in the Back Seat of My Cadillac" (Brown)
 "Every 1's a Winner" (Errol Brown) – 4:01

1997 re-release
 CD single
 "You Sexy Thing" (Errol Brown, Tony Wilson) – 4:02
 "You Sexy Thing (Remix)" (Errol Brown, Tony Wilson) – 3:46
 "Every 1's a Winner (Groove Mix)" (Errol Brown) – 3:54

Charts

Weekly charts

Year-end charts

Certifications

Cover versions
In 1997, two covers were released at almost the same time as the re-issue of the Hot Chocolate original. One cover was by pop duo T-Shirt, featuring actress Chloé Treend and songwriter Miranda Cooper, while the other version was by English pop/dance act Clock. Both are re-workings with the original music and lyrics but with new additional vocal segments.

T-Shirt version

Actress Chloé Treend and songwriter Miranda Cooper collaborated under the name T-Shirt to release another successful cover of "You Sexy Thing" in August 1997. This version reached number 63 in the United Kingdom, number five in New Zealand, and number six in Australia, where it stayed on the chart for 32 weeks. In Australia and New Zealand, it earned platinum certifications. British magazine Music Week rated this version three out of five, writing, "The Hot Chocolate hit gets a Spice Girls-style reworking with chirpy, cocky vocals mixed in with Errol Brown's soulful delivery. A fresh take on a pop classic."

Charts

Weekly charts

Year-end charts

Certifications

Clock version

British pop/dance act Clock released a cover of "You Sexy Thing" as "U Sexy Thing" in October 1997. It peaked at number eight in Ireland, number eleven in the United Kingdom and number 100 in Australia. On the Eurochart Hot 100, it reached its highest position as number 31 in November 1997. A music video was also produced to promote the single, featuring the act performing in a swimming pool.

Critical reception
A reviewer from Music Week rated Clock's version three out of five, adding, "Using what sounds like a sample from the Hot Chocolate version, this xerox cover has all the elements but little of Errol Brown's soul. Still, catchy enough to be a hit." The magazine's Alan Jones" wrote, Clock have ticked up an impressive number of hits over the past four years, and are destined for another with a rather tame remake (...). They stick closely to the original, save for a rather perfunctory rap but the song's quality wins the day."

Charts

References

External links
 [ "You Sexy Thing"] at Allmusic website

1975 songs
1975 singles
1987 singles
1997 singles
Atlantic Records singles
Big Tree Records singles
Hot Chocolate (band) songs
Clock (dance act) songs
RAK Records singles
Song recordings produced by Mickie Most
Songs written by Errol Brown
Songs written by Tony Wilson (musician)
Warner Records singles